Lambeth London Borough Council is the local authority for the London Borough of Lambeth in Greater London, England. It is a London borough council, and one of the 32 in the United Kingdom capital of London. The council meets at Lambeth Town Hall in Brixton. Lambeth is divided into 25 wards: thirteen are represented by 3 councillors and twelve are represented by 2. The council was first elected in 1964.

History
There have previously been a number of local authorities responsible for the Lambeth area. The current local authority was first elected in 1964, a year before formally coming into its powers and prior to the creation of the London Borough of Lambeth on 1 April 1965. Lambeth London Borough Council replaced Lambeth Metropolitan Borough Council and also took over some 40% of the area of the former Wandsworth Metropolitan Borough Council covering Streatham and Clapham. Both Metropolitan Boroughs were created in 1900 with Lambeth Metropolitan Borough Council replacing the Vestry of the Parish of Lambeth. The former Clapham and Streatham parishes, which became part of Lambeth in 1965, were governed by the Wandsworth District Board of Works from 1855 to 1900.

It was envisaged that through the London Government Act 1963 Lambeth as a London local authority would share power with the Greater London Council. The split of powers and functions meant that the Greater London Council was responsible for "wide area" services such as fire, ambulance, flood prevention, and refuse disposal; with the local authorities responsible for "personal" services such as social care, libraries, cemeteries and refuse collection. This arrangement lasted until 1986 when Lambeth London Borough Council gained responsibility for some services that had been provided by the Greater London Council, such as waste disposal. Lambeth was very active in the Ratecapping campaign in the 1980s. Lambeth became an education authority in 1990. Since 2000 the Greater London Authority has taken some responsibility for highways and planning control from the council, but within the English local government system the council remains a "most purpose" authority in terms of the available range of powers and functions.

In 1985, the council under the leadership of Ted Knight joined other left-wing councils in a rate-capping rebellion, although only Liverpool and Lambeth refused to set a legal budget. All 34 Labour councillors present voted on 7 March 1985 not to set a rate. On 9 September 1985 the district auditor for Lambeth gave notice that the delay in fixing the rates was wilful misconduct and so the councillors were required to repay the £126,947 costs as a surcharge. The amount per councillor was over £2,000 and therefore they were also disqualified from office. The surcharged councillors from Lambeth appealed against the surcharges. The High Court delivered its judgment on 6 March 1986, finding heavily against the councils; Lord Justice Glidewell described the stance of the councillors as "mere political posturing"; Mr Justice Caulfield described the evidence of wilful misconduct as "crushing" and the councillors' stance as having "reached a pinnacle of political perversity". The councillors were disqualified on 30 March.

The Labour Party had included an aspiration in their 2010 manifesto for Lambeth to become a "Co-operative Council" with greater use of mutualist models. This attracted considerable media interest in the run up to the May 2010 election, characterised as the notion of the 'John Lewis Council' in contrast to the 'EasyCouncil' model being promoted by the Conservative Party in Barnet.  Following the 2010 election, the Council established a Commission to look at what this might entail.

Child abuse scandal
In July 2021 the Independent Inquiry into Child Sexual Abuse published a report that was highly critical of the Council and which said serious abuse had been allowed to occur in five of Lambeth's children's homes between the 1960s and '90s; over 700 children had suffered cruelty and sexual abuse, although the Inquiry believed that the figure was likely to be significantly higher. The Inquiry found that a "culture of cover-up" had led to the abuse continuing over decades; the Council made an "unreserved apology to the victims".

Powers and functions
The local authority derives its powers and functions from the London Government Act 1963 and subsequent legislation, and has the powers and functions of a London borough council. It sets council tax and as a billing authority also collects precepts for Greater London Authority functions and business rates. It sets planning policies which complement Greater London Authority and national policies, and decides on almost all planning applications accordingly.  It is a local education authority  and is also responsible for council housing, social services, libraries, waste collection and disposal, traffic, and most roads and environmental health.

Leadership
Linda Bellos was leader of the council after Ted Knight was disqualified in 1986. She was the second Black woman to become leader of a British local authority, after Merle Amory in the  London Borough of Brent. Bellos resigned as leader on 21 April 1988, after disputes within the Labour Party over the setting of the council budget.

The leader of the council from 2006, Steve Reed, stepped down following his election as Member of Parliament for Croydon North on 29 November 2012 and was replaced by Councillor Lib Peck.

On 14 January 2019, Peck announced that she would stand down from the Council and as Leader to take a role as the head of the Mayor of London's Violence Reduction Unit. In the ensuing election among Labour councillors, Councillor Jack Hopkins was elected Leader. On 10 May 2021, Councillor Jack Hopkins announced he was stepping down as Leader and Deputy Leader Claire Holland was elected as Leader on 24 May 2021.

Notable councillors

Green Party
Jonathan Bartley, councillor for St Leonard's ward since 2018 and former Co-Leader of the Green Party.
Scott Ainslie, councillor for St Leonard's ward since 2014 and MEP for London until 2020.

Liberal Democrats
Anthony Bottrall, former British diplomat and councillor for Stockwell ward from 1994–2006.

Conservative Party
John Bercow, former councillor for St Leonard's ward (1994–1998) and Speaker of the House of Commons from 2009 to 2019.
John Major, former councillor for Ferndale ward (1968–1971) and former Prime Minister of the United Kingdom from 1990–1997.

Labour Party
 Ibrahim Dogus, councillor for Bishop's ward since 2018 and entrepreneur and restaurateur. 
Jim Dickson, councillor for Herne Hill and former Leader of Lambeth Council.
Steve Reed, former councillor for Brixton Hill (2006–2012) and Member of Parliament for Croydon North since 2012.
Florence Eshalomi, former councillor for Brixton Hill (2010–2018), Member of the London Assembly (2016–2021) and Member of Parliament for Vauxhall since 2019.
Marsha de Cordova, former councillor for Larkhall ward (2014–2018) and Member of Parliament for Battersea since 2017. 
Dan Sabbagh, former councillor for Vassall ward (2010–2014) and associate editor of The Guardian newspaper.
Kitty Ussher, former councillor for Vassall ward (1998–2002) and former Member of Parliament for Burnley (2005–2010).
Jonathan Myerson, former councillor for Clapham Town (2002–2006)
Lib Peck, former councillor for Thornton (2001-2019), former Leader of the Council (2012-2019) and Director of London's Violence Reduction Unit.

Wards
These are the new ward names from May 2022 following the electoral ward boundary review conducted by the independent Local Government Boundary Commission.

Brixton Acre Lane
Brixton North
Brixton Rush Common
Brixton Windrush
Clapham Common & Abbeville
Clapham East
Clapham Park
Clapham Town
Gipsy Hill
Herne Hill & Loughborough Junction
Kennington
Knight's Hill
Myatt's Fields
Oval
St Martin's
Stockwell East
Stockwell West & Larkhall
Streatham Common Common & Vale
Streatham Hill East
Streatham Hill West & Thornton
Streatham St Leonard's
Streatham Wells
Vauxhall
Waterloo & South Bank
West Dulwich

Summary results of elections

Summary of council election results:

References

Local authorities in London
London borough councils
Politics of the London Borough of Lambeth
Leader and cabinet executives
Local education authorities in England
Billing authorities in England